Darreh Khoshk-e Jafarvand (also Romanized as Darreh Khoshk-e Jāfarvand; also known as Darreh Khoshk) is a village in Ahmadfedaleh Rural District, Sardasht District, Dezful County, Khuzestan Province, Iran. At the 2006 census, its population was 19, in 5 families.

References 

Populated places in Dezful County